Ivan Prpić (11 October 1927 – 25 June 2019) was a Croatian physician.

He was born in Sisak in 1927 and graduated from the University of Zagreb School of Medicine in 1952, specializing in plastic reconstructive surgery. Prpić became a full professor at the Faculty of Medicine in 1976.

Prpić was a full member of the Croatian Academy of Sciences and Arts since 1991.

References

Sources

1927 births
2019 deaths
Croatian plastic surgeons
People from Sisak
School of Medicine, University of Zagreb alumni
Academic staff of the University of Zagreb
Members of the Croatian Academy of Sciences and Arts